The Minister for Further and Higher Education, Research, Innovation and Science (Irish: An  tAire  Breisoideachais agus Ardoideachais, Taighde, Nuálaíochta agus Eolaíochta) is a senior minister in the Government of Ireland and leads the Department of Further and Higher Education, Research, Innovation and Science.

The Minister for Further and Higher Education, Research, Innovation and Science is Simon Harris, TD.

He is assisted by Niall Collins, TD, Minister of State for Skills and Further Education.

List of office-holders

References

Government ministers of the Republic of Ireland
Lists of government ministers of Ireland
Ireland, Further and Higher Education, Research, Innovation and Science
Education ministers
Education in the Republic of Ireland
Science and technology in the Republic of Ireland
Minister